Lidköping Municipality (Lidköpings kommun) is a municipality in Västra Götaland County in western Sweden. Its seat is located in the city of Lidköping.

Lidköping sometimes refers to itself as "Lidköping by Vänern", possibly to distinguish itself from the namewise (and historically) similar city of Linköping in eastern Sweden.

Geography

Lidköping Municipality is, together with its western neighbor Götene, located on the Läckö-Kinnekulla peninsula. There are several Vänern islands that belong to the municipality. One of them is Läckö, where the Läckö Castle is a notable sight.

Demographics
Population numbers of the towns and villages, from SCB, December 31 of noted year.

Symbol
This logo is used in all official contexts, and also on the road signs when entering Lidköping.

See also
Köping (concept)

References

External links

Lidköping Municipality - Official site
Läckö Kinnekulle - The "Götene-Lidköping Vänern" tourism company
 Article Lidköping - From Nordisk Familjebok (vol. 16, 1912)
 Lidköpings kommun profilprogram.pdf Lidköping describes its symbol and its uses. In Swedish only.

Municipalities of Västra Götaland County
Skaraborg